A Secret Life: The Lies and Scandals of President Grover Cleveland is a 2011 historical book by American author Charles Lachman.

The book is about President Grover Cleveland's 1884 presidential campaign and the allegations that a decade earlier Cleveland had fathered an illegitimate son and had the child's mother committed to a mental asylum.

Sources

History books about the United States
2011 non-fiction books
American history books
Books about presidents of the United States
Grover Cleveland
Skyhorse Publishing books